St. Mary's College (CIC, which stands for College of the Immaculate Conception) is a government-assisted selective Catholic secondary school located in Port of Spain, Trinidad and Tobago.

Past principals
Source:

Fr. Victor Guilloux 1863–67 
Fr. Francis Xavier Corbet 1867–74 
Fr. Casimir Marcot 1874–76  
Fr. James Brown 1876–92
Fr. Achilles Lemire 1892–94
Fr. Nichlas Brennan 1894–95
Fr. William Carrol 1896–1903
Fr. John Gerard Neville 1903–10
Fr. Edward Crehan 1910–20
Fr. James Lacy 1920–24  
Fr. John English 1925–36  
Fr. James Meenan 1936–50  
Fr. James Brett 1951–59 
Fr. Pedro Valdez 1959–71
Fr. Arthur Lai Fook 1971–78 
Fr. Anthony de Verteuil 1978–92
Fr. Anton Dick 1992–99
Fr. Ronald Mendes 1999–2013
Nigel Joseph 2013–2023
Rawl Russell 2023-present

Notable alumni

 Ellis Achong, West Indies Test cricketer
 Emmanuel Amoroso, reproductive physiologist and developmental biologist
 Sir Ellis Clarke, second and last Governor-General of Trinidad and Tobago and the first President of Trinidad and Tobago.
 Diego Cisneros, businessman founder of  Grupo Cisneros
 Joshua Da Silva, West Indies Test cricketer
 Wayne A.I. Frederick, MD,  President of Howard University
 Ken Gordon, businessman
 Shaka Hislop, football player
 John La Rose, publisher and cultural activist
 Michael Mooleedhar, filmmaker
 Quintin O'Connor, union leader
 George Padmore (1903–1959), pan-Africanist, author
 Dr. Joseph Lennox Pawan, MBE, Trinidadian bacteriologist
 Clifford Roach, West Indies Test cricketer
 Dr. Harry Schachter, MD, PhD, Canadian biochemist
 Eugene Chen (1878–1944), Trinidadian-Chinese politician and foreign minister of Republic of China
 Jillionaire, DJ and music producer
 Leslie Fitzpatrick, soccer player.

References

External links 
 

Buildings and structures in Port of Spain
Catholic schools in Trinidad and Tobago
Educational institutions established in 1863
1863 establishments in Trinidad and Tobago